If I Knew What You Said is a 2009 Filipino drama/romance film directed and written by Mike Sandejas.

Plot 
The romantic film revolved around a rocker and a deaf boy. One lives in silence while other in noise and fear. The two met in a Baguio camp where hearing kids were mixed with non-hearing kids to find their common ground, which is their love for music.

Cast 
 Zoe Sandejas as Nina Sevilla
 Romalito Mallari as Kiko Reyes
 Adriana Agcaoili as Mrs. Sevilla
 Bronson Escalderon as Joseph

Release 
The film was released on 16 October 2009 and produced under Cinemalaya and Echo and Mirage Entertainment.

Reception 
Dinig Sana Kita is the first and only Filipino film to cast a deaf actor. Romalito Mallari is deaf in real life and is a performer for several stage productions.

References

External links
 

2009 films
Philippine romantic drama films
2009 romantic drama films